The New York State Court of Claims is the court of the New York State Unified Court System which handles all claims against the State of New York and certain state agencies.

Judges
Judges of the Court of Claims are appointed by the Governor of New York and confirmed by the State Senate for a 9-year term. While there are Judges of the Court of Claims who handle only claims against the state, there are many Judges of the Court of Claims who are appointed to this post and then assigned to serve as an Acting Justice of the New York State Supreme Court, generally in the criminal term of the court. This is done to increase the number of trial judges in the state for felony crimes, as it can be easier for Legislators to vote to increase the number of Court of Claims judges than Supreme Court Justices in view of differences in the manner of selecting the judges.

History
Claims against the State of New York were originally heard and decided by the New York State Legislature. In 1874, a constitutional amendment was ratified which prohibited the Legislature to assess claims against the State, and in 1876 the State Board of Audit (later renamed Board of Claims) was created to step in. In 1897, the Board of Claims was abolished and a Court of Claims, consisting of three judges, created instead. On July 31, 1911, the Court of Claims was abolished and the Board of Claims, consisting of three commissioners, was restored.

The present Court of Claims was re-established on January 28, 1915, to succeed the Board of Claims.

See also
United States Court of Federal Claims

Notes

External links
 New York State Court of Claims
 Uniform Rules for the Court of Claims in the NYCRR

New York (state) state courts
1897 establishments in New York (state)
1911 disestablishments in New York (state)
Courts and tribunals established in 1897
Courts and tribunals disestablished in 1911